The Night That Changed America: A Grammy Salute to the Beatles is a television program and tribute to English rock group the Beatles. It aired on CBS on February 9, 2014 (original) and February 12, 2014 (rerun) in the United States and ITV in the United Kingdom on May 2, 2014. The tribute, presented by the Recording Academy, AEG Ehrlich Ventures and the CBS television network, commemorated the legacy of the band and marked the 50th anniversary of their first performance on The Ed Sullivan Show. Kenneth Ehrlich served as executive producer, with Rac Clark as co-executive producer. The production was written by David Wild and Ehrlich and directed by Gregg Gelfand.

Description
The program, presented by the Recording Academy, AEG Ehrlich Ventures and CBS, serves as a tribute to the legacy of the Beatles and the 50th anniversary of their first appearance on The Ed Sullivan Show. Scheduled to air on February 9, 2014, the concert was filmed on January 27, 2014 at the Los Angeles Convention Center's West Hall, located in Los Angeles, California, one day following the 56th Annual Grammy Awards. Kenneth Ehrlich served as executive producer, with Rac Clark as co-executive producer. The production was written by David Wild and Ehrlich and directed by Gregg Gelfand.

Paul McCartney and Ringo Starr, the two surviving members of the band, attended and performed at the concert. McCartney admitted to having some initial hesitation about the project: "What can I say about this evening, it's just amazing [...] At first when I was asked to do the show, I was wondering if it was the right thing to do. Was it seemly to tribute yourself? But I saw a couple of American guys who said to me, 'You don't understand the impact of that appearance on the show on America.' I didn't realize that."

Clips of the Beatles performing on The Ed Sullivan Show were also included in the program, as well as an interview with Paul and Ringo by David Letterman in Studio 50 (Ed Sullivan Theater).

Performances

House band
 Don Was – bass, musical director
 Steve Lukather – guitars
 Peter Frampton – guitars
 Rami Jaffee – organ
 Greg Phillinganes – keyboards, piano
 Chris Caswell – keyboards
 Kenny Aronoff – drums
 Lenny Castro – percussion
 Larry Hall – trumpet
 Nick Lane – trombone
 Larry Williams – saxophone, woodwind
 Kari Kimmel – background vocals
 Judith Hill – background vocals
 Carmel Echols – background vocals

Paul McCartney's Band
 Rusty Anderson – guitars
 Brian Ray – guitars, bass 
 Paul "Wix" Wickens – keyboards 
 Abe Laboriel Jr – drums

Presenters (in order of appearance)
 LL Cool J
 Johnny Depp
 Eric Idle (edited for broadcast)
 Kate Beckinsale
 Anna Kendrick
 Jeff Bridges (edited for broadcast)
 Sean Penn

See also
 Collaborations between ex-Beatles
 The Beatles on The Ed Sullivan Show
 Tributes to the Beatles

References

External links
 

2014 in American television
2014 in music
CBS television specials
Musical tributes to the Beatles
Television programmes about the Beatles